Pauline Ramart (22 November 1880 – 17 March 1953) was a French chemist and a politician. She was the second woman to be appointed as a full professor at the  University of Paris, after Marie Curie.

Biography
Born on 22 November 1880 in Paris, Pauline Ramart was the daughter of blacksmith René Lucas and his wife Marie Perrine Ceniguar. To support her studies, she was selling artificial flowers. Her determination to study made her to enroll in evening classes.  She earned her secondary school diploma, and took English lessons from a pharmacist, who identified her interest in chemistry. At the age of 29, she obtained a licence in physical sciences.

She started her professional career in the laboratory of Albin Haller at the Faculty of Sciences in Paris. She then became a trainer at the Pasteur Institute. In 1913 she obtained her doctorate in organic chemistry on the "synthesis of alcohols" from the University of Paris, Sorbonne under the supervision of Haller.

After completing a long years of service at the Pasteur Institute, in 1925, she became a lecturer at the Faculty of Sciences, University of Paris, with support of  Jean Perrin. In 1930 she became the second woman to be appointed as   a full professor at the University of Paris, after Marie Curie.

She was the chair of organic chemistry at the Faculty of Sciences in Paris from 1944 to until her death in 1953. She played a major role in advocating women's right to vote during her office as the vice-president of the National Education section of the Provisional Consultative Assembly, France.

For her contributions to science, she received several awards and recognition including the France’s Legion of Honor, and the Ellen H. Richards Research Prize from the American Association of University Women.

She died in Paris on 17 March 1953.

References

1880 births
1953 deaths
French chemists
French women chemists
Academic staff of the University of Paris